Christian Sachau Saloon, also known as the American-Gertsch Glass, Inc., is a historic commercial building located at St. Joseph, Missouri. It was built in 1889, and is a two-story brick building with elaborate cast-metal ornamentation on the primary facade.  It has a unique central entranceway with a round arched-door opening.

It was listed on the National Register of Historic Places in 1985.

References

Commercial buildings on the National Register of Historic Places in Missouri
Commercial buildings completed in 1889
Buildings and structures in St. Joseph, Missouri
National Register of Historic Places in Buchanan County, Missouri